Sri Madvirat Veerabrahmendra Swami Charitra is a 1984 Indian Telugu-language biographical film, based on life of Pothuluri Veerabrahmam, produced and directed by N. T. Rama Rao under his Ramakrishna Cine Studios banner. N. T. Rama Rao portrayed the characters of Gautama Buddha, Vemana, Ramanuja, Adi Shankara along with the title role. It stars Nandamuri Balakrishna, Rati Agnihotri and Kanchana with music composed by Susarla Dakshinamurthi. Actually, shooting of the film was completed by 1981, but the release got delayed due to objection from the censor board asking to delete a few scenes from the movie, to which NTR did not agree and immediately took the matter to court and finally got it released in November 1984.

Plot
The film begins with a brief life of Gautama Buddha, Ramanuja, Adi Shankara & Vemana. Next, it shifts to Sri Madvirat Potuluri Veerabrahmam Swamy a futurist whose parents Paripurnacharya & Prakrutamba dies in a flash of his birth. Whereupon, he is adopted by a couple Veerabhojacharya & Veerapapamamba. At the age of 10, his foster father also passes away when he quits his mother. Before leaving, he teaches her the secret of life, the delivery process, and their debt has been completed. Years roll by, and Veerabrahmam as a wanderer reaches a town Banaganapalli and turns into a cowherd at Achamma. Day-to-day he keeps his stick as a protector when the palm tree itself bows its head down to befit as a source for him. On the benefit of the doubt, Achamma is behind him. Hither, she spots Veerabrahmam sculpting his scripture kaalagnynam which proclaims how the country will be after 5000 years of Kaliyuga. 

Especially, the destruction of the caste system, British Empire occupying the country, the birth of Mahatma Gandhi and relieving from slavery, and the existence of the modern woman. Consequently, he buries his scripture and covers it with a tamarind plant and says that at the end of Kaliyuga it will shower blood and flourishes yellow flowers when he will arrive as Veera Bhoga Vasanta Rayalu to establish piety. Next, Veerabrahmam continues his journey and lands at a new location, molding himself as a blacksmith. Soon, he constructs a house and conducts almsgiving every day beyond castes. Further, he nuptials a benevolent Govindamma and is blessed with progeny. It begrudges a few sly men Karanam & Munasab of the village and puts fire to his house. Plus, they command them to perform worship & processions in name of God and order Veerabrahmam to model the chariot in one night. Anyhow, he does so with his spiritual power which punishes the evil who comes to an understandable state by Veerabrahmam's magnanimous.

Besides, Sayyad an ambitious Muslim guy endears his maternal uncle’s daughter Raziya and the elders decide to knit them. At that point, he is perplexed by witnessing several disabled people and is desperate. Forthwith, he gets enlightenment from Veerabrahmam to know the meaning of life. Then, Sayyad proceeds to him forsaking all and Veerabrahmam receives him as a disciple titling him Siddha. Sensing it, Sayyad’s uncle complices with the Muslim ruler against Veerabrahmam and he organizes a judicial inquiry. Whereupon, Sayyad announces that there are no boundaries for devotion which merges as universal love. Subsequently, he triumphs in onerous tasks when amazed Nawab invites Veerabrahmam. In what respect, he forecasts a diverse newfangled i.e., occurrence of so-called saints, unions in all fields & strikes for a trifle, currency dominating the world, dirty politics, atrocities going to happen in modern society, destruction of temples, division of Pakistan and clashes at Kashmir. Moreover, the formation of dams, trains, aircraft, current, radio, television, etc. 

Later, Veerabrahmam moves forward with Siddha when the various aristocracy heckles him whom he locks by showing his marvel. All along the line, Siddha stands as his top pupil. Parallelly, Veerabrahmam forgoes his preachings viz drowning of Hyderabad, draughts, tsunami effects, communism, gold rate hikes, 6 years girl giving birth to a boy, actors transforming into elders, etc. As well as, he provides knowledge of Kundalini the seven wheels in the human body before scheduled caste people Harijans. Presently, Veerabrahmam affirms to take salvation Sajeeva Samadhi i.e., buried alive. Here, he runs a test on Siddha's adoration by entrusting him to get flowers for his prayer from Banaganapalli on one impossible night. Nevertheless, Siddha victories it with his allegiance. By the time, he backs Veerabrahmam takes salvation when Siddha woes before his sepulcher. At last, Veerabrahmam spells to Siddha by declaring him as his heir and asks him to continue his mission by getting espoused. He will get salvation by reincarnation as Bala Yogi and endorses him with his shoes, & personal effects for the memories of his great service. Finally, the movie ends on a happy note.

Cast

 N. T. Rama Rao as Sri Potuluri Veerabrahmendra Swamy, Gautama Buddha, Aadi Shankaracharya, Ramanujacharya & Yogi Vemana (Five roles)
 Nandamuri Balakrishna  as Sayyad/ Siddayya
 Satyanarayana as Kakkadu
 Allu Ramalingaiah as Karanam
 Mikkilineni as Siva Kotaiah
 Mukkamala as Siddayya's father-in-law
 Rallapalli as Bhooshaiah
 P. J. Sarma  as Munsab
 Chalapathi Rao as Sultan
 Chitti Babu
 Madan Mohan
 Rati Agnihotri as Raziya
 Rushyendramani as Veerapapamanba
 Kanchana as Govindamma
 Devika as Gollalu
 Prabha as Vishwada
 Annapurna as Siddayya's mother
 Kavita as Polamma
 Dubbing Janaki as Yekukalasani
 Rajyalakshmi 
 Krishnaveni as Veeranarayanamma
 Master Harish as Child Veerabrahmendra Swamy

Soundtrack

Music composed by Susarla Dakshinamurthi. Lyrics written by C. Narayana Reddy. Music released on Saregama Audio Company.

Box office
This movie was an all time blockbuster movie, which was the first Telugu film collected above 1cr gross collection in its first week, it collected Rs.6 cr in its full run, and  ran for 300 days in Hyderabad.

References

External links
 

1984 films
Indian epic films
1980s Telugu-language films
Indian biographical films
Films scored by Susarla Dakshinamurthi
Films directed by N. T. Rama Rao
1980s biographical films